Lal Chowk is a city square in Srinagar, Jammu and Kashmir, India. 

The square was given its name by left-wing activists who were inspired by the Russian Revolution as they fought the princely state's Maharaja, Hari Singh. It has traditionally served as a place for political meetings, with Jawaharlal Nehru and Sheikh Abdullah (the first prime ministers of India and Jammu and Kashmir, respectively) as well as other prominent political leaders having addressed people from it. The clock tower at Lal Chowk was built in 1980.

Description
The Lal Chowk precinct stretches on both the sides of the Residency Road between the Amira Kadal bridge and the Tyndale Biscoe School. It has evolved into Srinagar's main business district from early twentieth century.

The Lal Chowk itself is a traffic roundabout towards its eastern end. It houses a clock tower (ganta ghar) constructed by Bajaj Electricals in 1980.

History

Lal Chowk was the location where Jawaharlal Nehru, the first Prime Minister of India, unfurled the Indian national flag in 1948, shortly after the country gained independence from the British Empire. Following the Indo-Pakistani War of 1947–1948, Nehru stood in Lal Chowk and promised the Kashmiri people a chance to vote in a referendum whereby they would be able to choose their political future. The city square was also the location where Sheikh Abdullah, the first elected Prime Minister of Jammu and Kashmir, expressed his allegiance to Nehru and India in a Persian couplet, saying "Man Tu Shudam, Tu Man Shudi, Taqas Na Goyed, Man Degram Tu Degri (I became you and you became I; so none can say we are separate)".

1990s 
In 1990 separatists had dared anyone to try and raise the flag of India at Lal Chowk. The National Security Guards took up the challenge and raised the flag. The clock tower gained political significance in 1992, when the then Bharatiya Janata Party president, Murli Manohar Joshi, hoisted the Indian flag on top of the tower on Republic Day. Joshi hoisted the flag in the company of Indian troops. Since then, the Indian Border Security Force and Central Reserve Police Force undertook the hoisting ceremony until 2009, when they announced that continuing the ritual was unnecessary because the tower "had no political significance". Following this, official ceremonies were held at the nearby Bakshi Stadium in Wazir Bagh Srinagar on Republic Day and Independence Day.

1993 Lal Chowk fire 

In 1993, there was an arson attack on the main commercial centre of downtown Srinagar. The fire was alleged to have been started by a crowd incited by separatist militants. The civilians and police officials interviewed by Human Rights Watch and other international organizations alleged that the Indian Border Security Force (BSF) set fire to the locality, apparently in retaliation to the burning of an abandoned BSF building by local residents. Over 125 Kashmiri civilians were killed in the incident.

2011 Republic Day 

In 2011, the Bharatiya Janata Yuva Morcha (BJYM), youth wing of the Bharatiya Janata Party (BJP), announced its plan to start a march called "Ektha Yatra" from Kolkata, West Bengal to Srinagar. The purpose of the march was to "unite Indians" on the Kashmir issue and challenge pro-Pakistan separatists by hoisting the flag of India atop the tower in Lal Chowk on 26 January 2011—India's Republic Day. This move was reportedly intended to serve as a response to Kashmiri insurgents, who had earlier hoisted the flag of Pakistan at the same place. The march was opposed by the Indian National Congress and the Jammu and Kashmir National Conference, who were fearful that it might fuel further unrest in Muslim-majority Kashmir.

Following the announcement by the BJYM, the central government took various countermeasures to stop the planned march. Trains carrying BJYM members to Srinagar were stopped and sent back to their locations of departure. While the majority of BJYM members failed to reach the Kashmir Valley, top BJP leaders, namely Sushma Swaraj and Arun Jaitley, continued to lead the march until they were stopped while attempting to enter Jammu & Kashmir from Indian Punjab via a bridge crossing the Ravi River on 25 January 2011. All BJP members in the rally were subsequently arrested and kept in custody in the city of Jammu until the end of formalities on Republic Day.

Indian security forces were instructed to heavily cordon Lal Chowk on Republic Day. However, some BJP activists reached Srinagar and hoisted the Indian flag near the city square, although they failed to reach their intended destination on top of the clock tower.

Sushma Swaraj, upon her arrest by security forces, said: "Why are we being arrested? We were marching peacefully. Those who burn the national flag are being provided security while those holding the national flag are being stopped." Arun Jaitley said: "For the first time after independence, hoisting national tricolour has become illegal in our country."

29 January 2023

On this day, Rahul Gandhi unfurled national tricolour in Lal Chowk as the party's mass outreach program "Bharat Jodo Yatra" was one day left to end in Srinagar.

The Bharat Jodo Yatra Completed of "30 January 2023" after unfurled  National Tricolour by Rahul Gandhi  in Sher-E-Kashmir Stadium,Srinagar.

See also

 Lal Bazar
 Hazratbal
 Rajbagh
 Jawahar Nagar Srinagar

Notes

References 

Srinagar
Buildings and structures in Jammu and Kashmir
Tourist attractions in Srinagar
Neighbourhoods in Srinagar
Cities and towns in Srinagar district